Sinthiang Koundara (or Sinthiang Coundara) is a rural community of Bonconto Arrondissement in the Vélingara Department, Kolda Region, Senegal.

Sinthiang Koundara commune includes the village of Nadjaf Al Ashraf, a village founded by Shi'i religious leader Cherif Mohamed Aly Aidara.

Notable people
Cherif Mohamed Aly Aidara, founder of the international NGO Mozdahir

References

Kolda Region
Communes of Senegal